Type 86 may refer to:

 A People's Republic of China reversed engineered version of the BMP-1 armoured personnel carrier, see Type 86 (infantry fighting vehicle)
 Norinco Type 86 assault rifle
 T86 assault rifle or Type 86 assault rifle
 Bristol Type 86 biplane

See also
 Class 86 (disambiguation)